Willie Bryan (born 1947 in Walsh Island, County Offaly) is an Irish former Gaelic footballer who played for his local club Walsh Island and at senior level for the Offaly county team from 1966 until 1978. Bryan captained Offaly to the All-Ireland SFC title in 1971.

References

 

1946 births
Living people
All Stars Awards winners (football)
Leinster inter-provincial Gaelic footballers
Offaly inter-county Gaelic footballers
Walsh Island Gaelic footballers